Maldin Bujar Ymeraj (born 6 March 1995) is an Albanian professional footballer who plays as a midfielder.

Club career

Early career
Maldin Ymeraj was born in Mallakastër, Albania and his parents emigrated in Greece when Maldin was 2 years old. His name is not coincidentally similar to the icon of Milan, Paolo Maldini. His father Bujar recounts: "I was a fan of Paolo Maldini and I promised friends that if the child was boy, will line Maldini name". Ymeraj started his youth career at Panathinaikos F.C. academies at age of 7. He was scorer of U-17 Academy of Panathinaikos as a 15 years old.

Panathinaikos
During the 2013–14 season on 13 March 2014 Panathinaikos announced that reached an agreement to sign professional contracts with Ymeraj and the fellow young footballers Nestoras Gekas, Stefanos Kotsaris, Dimitris Myrthianos, Marios Tzanoulinos, Vasilis Angelopoulos, Michail Peter Niouman, Paschalis Staikos, Lazaros Lamprou and Dimitris Aggelopoulos.

Fostiras
On 29 January 2015 Ymeraj was loaned until the end of the 2014–15 season to Fostiras F.C. first team to gain experience. He made his first professional debut on 1 February 2015 by coming on as a 64th-minute substitute in place of Christos Moustogiannis in a goalless draw against Chania.

Akropolis
In July 2015, Ymeraj moved to Swedish Division 1 Norra club Akropolis IF. He made his league debut for the club on 23 August 2015 in a 4-2 away victory over Carlstad United. In this match, he also scored his first league goal for the club. His goal, scored in the 49th minute, made the score 2-2. He played all ninety minutes of the match.

Kukësi
In January 2017, Ymeraj moved to Albanian Superliga club FK Kukësi. He made his league debut for the club on 24 February 2018 in a 1-0 home victory over KF Laçi. He was subbed on for Eni Imami in the 69th minute.

International career
Ymeraj was included in the list of coach Ardian Mema the representative U-15 training accumulation talents became Albanian, living in Greece who became the U-17 and U-15, but could not appear. His declared that his big dream is red and black national team of Albania.

Albania U17

Albania U19

Albania U20

Albania U21
Ymeraj was called up for the first time at the Albania national under-21 football team by the coach Skënder Gega for the friendly match against Italy u21 on 6 May 2014, the first match ever for Albania U21 after had finished their 2017 UEFA European Under-21 Championship qualification campaign. His next invitation then came to participate in for a mini preparatory stage in Turkey, wreathed with detailed program of Skënder Gega coach, the team also played 3 friendly matches: On 20 January 2015 against Iran U-20, on 22 January against Ukraine U21 counterparts while two days later, on Sunday in front of Albania dated 25 January against China U-23.

Career statistics

Club

References

External links

1995 births
Living people
People from Mallakastër
Albanian footballers
Association football midfielders
Albania under-21 international footballers
Albania youth international footballers
Fostiras F.C. players
Akropolis IF players
FK Kukësi players
Luftëtari Gjirokastër players
Panachaiki F.C. players
Football League (Greece) players
Super League Greece 2 players
Ettan Fotboll players
Kategoria Superiore players
Albanian expatriate footballers
Albanian emigrants to Greece
Albanian expatriate sportspeople in Greece
Expatriate footballers in Greece
Albanian expatriate sportspeople in Sweden
Expatriate footballers in Sweden